Nipuna Deshan (born 1 March 1999) is a Sri Lankan cricketer. He made his List A debut for Panadura Sports Club in the 2018–19 Premier Limited Overs Tournament on 10 March 2019.

References

External links
 

1999 births
Living people
Sri Lankan cricketers
Panadura Sports Club cricketers
Place of birth missing (living people)